Travis Rettenmaier and Simon Stadler were the defending champions but decided not to participate.
Laurynas Grigelis and Alessandro Motti won the final 6–4, 6–4 against Rameez Junaid and Igor Zelenay.

Seeds

Draw

Draw

References
 Main Draw

Tennis Napoli Cup - Doubles
2012 Doubles